The second Liverpool City Region mayoral election was held in May 2021 to elect the mayor of the Liverpool City Region, alongside other local elections across England and Wales, to elect councillors, the mayor of Liverpool, and police and crime commissioners across the city region. The election was originally due to take place in May 2020, but was postponed due to the COVID-19 pandemic.

Background
The position of Mayor of the Liverpool City Region was created in 2017 following a devolution deal between the UK government and the Liverpool City Region Combined Authority (LCRCA). The Cities and Local Government Devolution Act 2016 required a directly elected metro mayor for combined authorities to receive additional powers from central government. Under the terms of the devolution deal, the first mayoral term was set to last until 2020, followed by elections every four years. The Liverpool City Region is defined as having six boroughs which includes the county of Merseyside (Knowsley, Liverpool, St Helens, Sefton, and Wirral) and the Borough of Halton.

In March 2019, Rotheram requested that the police and crime commissioner role for the Merseyside Police be incorporated into the role of the mayor of the Liverpool City Region. The request is in line with the powers the Greater Manchester and London mayors, who have authority and oversight over Greater Manchester Police and the Metropolitan Police Service, respectively. This was supported by the leader of Knowsley Borough Council. This would require the expansion of Merseyside Police to cover the Borough of Halton, which is in the boundaries of Cheshire Constabulary. However, this did not happen.

Candidates

Conservative Party
Jade Marsden was selected as candidate for the Conservative Party. Marsden was previously the parliamentary candidate for both the Bootle and Sefton Central constituencies.

Labour Party
The incumbent mayor, Steve Rotheram, was reselected as candidate for the Labour Party in August 2019 after receiving enough support from local Constituency Labour Parties.

In January 2020, before the COVID-19 pandemic affected the United Kingdom, mayor Rotheram made it a core pledge of his re-election campaign that he would "guarantee a job, training or an apprenticeship opportunity to every young person within six months of them becoming unemployed".

Liberal Democrats

Andy Corkhill, councillor for Oxton, Wirral was originally selected as the Liberal Democrat candidate, but later withdrew because of health reasons so David Newman was selected to stand as the Lib Dem candidate. Andy Corkhill died in October 2021. Newman lives in Southport and stood in Liverpool Walton at the 2019 general election.

Green Party
The Green Party candidate for Metro Mayor is Gary Cargill, an actor who has appeared in several hit TV programmes and Hollywood films.

Results

Results by Local Authority

Halton

Knowsley

Liverpool

Sefton

St Helens

Wirral

See also
 2021 Liverpool City Council election
 2021 Mayor of Liverpool election
 2021 Merseyside police and crime commissioner election
 2021 Wirral Metropolitan Borough Council election

References

Liverpool City Region mayoral election
Elections in Merseyside
Mayoral elections in England
2020s in Merseyside